Ampthillia is an extinct genus of cephalopod belonging to the Ammonite subclass.

References

Jurassic ammonites